Tell Mar Elias is a tell, i. e. an archaeological mound, located slightly outside the town limits and northwest of Ajloun in the Ajloun Governorate, northern Jordan, in the historical region of Gilead. "Elias" is the Latin and Arabic form for Elijah, the prophet whom the Hebrew Bible's  1 Kings calls "the Tishbite", which can be interpreted to mean that he lived, or was even born, in a town named  Tishbe. The ruins of the historical town of Listib ("el-Ishtib" or "el-Istib" in Arabic) have been traditionally identified with Tishbe, and are located just across a valley from  the tell. The ruins of a Byzantine monastery dedicated to prophet Elijah and including two churches can be seen on the tell.

Archaeology
Because of its proximity to the assumed location of the religiously significant Tishbe, two Christian churches were erected on the tell during the Byzantine period, a smaller one in the 4th-5th, and a large one in the 6th century CE. The later is among the largest known Byzantine churches from Jordan. The Byzantine monastery with the two churches has been recently excavated by Jordanian archaeologists. A mosaic inscription, part of one of the church floors, mentions prophet Elijah. Artifacts from the site, including marble carvings and small metal religious objects, are displayed in the archaeological museum of nearby Ajloun Castle.

Significance in Islam
"Respect for the spirit of Nebhī-Ilyâs", as the prophet Elias is called in the Koran, "is given to a grove of oak trees above the ruins" of the Byzantine churches there.

Gallery

References

External links

Virtual Tour of Tell Mar Elias
Archival / digitized 35mm slide photos of the site (via the American Center of Research)
More pictures of the ruined church, including its mosaics
Photos of Tell Mar Elias at the Manar al-Athar photo archive

Video
 The Road to Mar Elias Cathedral
 Mar Elias Cathedral

Archaeological sites in Jordan
Tourism in Jordan
Gilead
Elijah